Nwoye may refer to:
 Charles Nwoye (born 1996), Nigerian player of Canadian football
 Ifeoma Nwoye (born 1993), Nigerian wrestler
 Tony Nwoye, Nigerian politician
 May Ifeoma Nwoye, Nigerian academic